Eugene Francis Haas (born November 12, 1952) is the American founder, president, and sole stockholder of Haas Automation, a CNC machine tool manufacturer. He also has a presence in motorsports, having founded NASCAR team Haas CNC Racing (now known as Stewart-Haas Racing) and the Formula One team, Haas F1 Team.

Haas Automation 

Haas graduated from California State University, Northridge in 1975 with a Bachelor of Science degree in accounting and finance. He originally majored in engineering but switched to business after Lockheed nearly went bankrupt. After graduation he was unable to find employment that paid more than what he was earning at his summer machine shop job. So, for the next few years he worked as a machinist and CNC programmer. In 1978, he opened Pro-turn Engineering, a small machine shop with two employees.

In 1980, Haas noticed that it took one of his employees a long time to manually position an indexer. Haas thought that building his own indexer with a stepper motor drive would be more efficient. He built one for himself and a few more for other machine shops. In March 1983, he displayed his indexer at WESTEC (an industry expo). After seeing the positive reaction of attendees, he decided to form Haas Automation to mass-produce them. His first commercial product, the HBI-5C (Haas Brothers Indexer), sold well because it was programmable and inexpensive. In 1986, Haas and a partner were awarded a US patent for their invention.

In 1988, Haas started production on a fully enclosed CNC machining center priced well below the competition. Some believed Haas copied or reverse engineered this machine, but at the time existing machines were so hard to use that Haas used them as an example of what not to do. Over time, Haas machine tools became extremely popular, mostly because they were simple, very affordable, and operator-friendly.

By 1996, Haas had outgrown its facilities in Chatsworth, California, and began a search that ultimately brought it to Oxnard, California. In March 1997, the move was completed into the Oxnard factory, a  facility.

Haas Automation is now the largest machine tool manufacturer in the United States. Sales for 2014 reached a record, reportedly exceeding $1 billion worldwide.

Auto racing

NASCAR 

In 2002, Haas formed a NASCAR race team, Haas CNC Racing. After purchasing the Concord, North Carolina-based Craftsman Truck race facility from Hendrick Motorsports, Haas CNC Racing began work on its first entry in the Winston Cup (now known as the NASCAR Cup Series) Series as a single-car team. The first entry for the new team was September 30, 2002 with driver Jack Sprague, who finished 35th after a crash. The team raced only three times in 2002. By 2003 the team was running full-time with several driver changes over the season. The team won its first race in the then-Busch Series in 2004 with driver Jason Leffler. By 2006 the team had relocated to a new, state-of-the-art facility in Kannapolis, North Carolina, and was fielding a full-time two car team in the Cup Series. At the end of 2008, the team was still struggling with a career-average finish of just under 27th place.

Late in 2008, Haas announced that he would join forces with driver Tony Stewart; Stewart would drive for the team and in return would be given a 50% stake in the company. Stewart led the points for much of 2009, winning four times at Pocono, Daytona, Watkins Glen, and Kansas, ending up sixth in points. Stewart had a mediocre 2010 before picking up wins at Atlanta and Fontana, while Newman won at Phoenix. Stewart won the 2011 Sprint Cup Championship, winning 5 of the 10 Chase races.

Haas was present at the first team win in May 2009 when Stewart won the All-Star Race. Haas also joined Stewart on the podium at Homestead-Miami Speedway on November 20, 2011, as Stewart won the Ford EcoBoost 400 that day and claimed his third Sprint Cup Championship. Stewart-Haas won their second Cup title with Kevin Harvick in 2014. On September 30, 2015, Stewart announced his retirement from the Cup Series as a driver following the 2016 season.

The team currently runs cars in the Cup Series for Harvick (No. 4), Chase Briscoe (No. 14), Aric Almirola (No. 10) and Ryan Preece (No. 41).

With Cole Custer's victory at New Hampshire in September 2014, Haas joined a select club of owners who have won as an owner in all three national touring series, joining Rick Hendrick, Richard Childress, Jack Roush, Bill Davis and Dale Earnhardt DEI.

Formula One 

In January 2014, Haas confirmed that he had formally submitted to the FIA his interest in entering a team in the F1 championship in 2015 or 2016, initially named Haas Formula and Haas Racing Developments. On April 11, 2014, Haas announced that he had been granted a license from the FIA. On May 28, however, it was revealed that the team would delay its debut until 2016, with Haas officially confirming the postponement on June 4. In September 2014, the team took up its current name of Haas F1 Team to better promote its involvement in the chosen sport. In December 2014, it was further reported that Haas purchased major assets from the bankrupted Marussia F1 team, which was confirmed in early 2015.

Wind Shear wind tunnel 

In 2006 planning began for a commercial wind tunnel. Haas commissioned California-based Triliad Development to oversee the project. The facility was designed to be the most advanced automotive wind tunnel in the world. The rolling road accurately simulates the dynamics of a car on the race track, unlike traditional fixed-floor tunnels. Construction of the new wind tunnel began in 2007 and was completed by year-end. After six months of commissioning, the wind tunnel opened to its first customer, a Formula One race team, in July 2008. Today the Wind Shear facility counts numerous NASCAR, IndyCar, Formula One and American Le Mans Series teams as customers. Wind Shear is owned 100% by Haas.

Philanthropic activities 
Haas Automation and Haas were the recipient of the Roy Pinkerton Award, presented by United Way, Ventura County Chapter. Many engineering colleges have "CNC Labs" outfitted with machines he donated, including California Polytechnic State University (Cal Poly), California State University, Channel Islands, California State University, Northridge, and De Anza College.

Haas also has been a generous donor to two-year colleges, most recently Danville Community College through the award of a $1 million grant in April 2015 to support an Associate of Applied Science degree program in Integrated Machining Technology. The program, which will be housed in the Gene Haas Center for Integrated Machining in Danville, Virginia, will build upon the college's existing 80-credit Precision Machining Technology two-year diploma program.

The Gene Haas Foundation 
The Gene Haas Foundation has provided charitable donations since 2001 including Hospice Foundation, Boy Scouts of America, Los Angeles Mission, YMCA Kids Camp, NAACP, Children's Hospital Los Angeles, MS Society, and others.

Criminal tax evasion 
On June 19, 2006, Haas was arrested by IRS agents for investigation of filing false tax returns, witness intimidation, and conspiracy. Four others were indicted together with Haas, all of whom pleaded guilty.

Just before Haas's case was to go to trial, a plea agreement was reached, whereby he would plead guilty to felony conspiracy to commit tax evasion. He was sentenced to two years in prison and ordered to pay $75 million in restitution.

Haas was incarcerated beginning January 2008 and was released on probation on May 7, 2009, after serving 16 months of his two-year sentence.

References 

 Gene Haas Foundation data provided by Manager, Gene Haas Foundation, 2800 Sturgis Road, Oxnard, California 93030

External links 

 Industry Week article on Haas Automation
 Official Haas Automation website
 Official Stewart-Haas Racing site
 Haas's biography at Haas Automation
 

1952 births
Living people
American businesspeople convicted of crimes
American manufacturing businesspeople
American people convicted of tax crimes
Businesspeople from California
California State University, Northridge alumni
Engineers from California
Formula One team owners
NASCAR team owners